Lipscomb Academy is a private, college preparatory, Christian school serving students from pre-kindergarten through twelfth grade, located in Nashville, Tennessee, United States.

History 

The Nashville Bible School was founded in 1891 by David Lipscomb and James A. Harding. By 1896 the school had three divisions: collegiate, intermediate, and primary. Most of the primary students were children of faculty members. Although a section of the school equivalent to high school has always existed, there has not always been a strict curriculum and graduation requirements as seen today. In the very early years of the school, high school students took the courses of their own selection and, when they felt ready, went on to college level courses. High school students lived in dormitories with the college students until the 1950s.
In June 2012, the school changed its name from David Lipscomb Campus School to Lipscomb Academy.

References

External links 
 

Lipscomb University
Preparatory schools in Tennessee
Private K-12 schools in Tennessee
Schools in Nashville, Tennessee
Educational institutions established in 1891
1891 establishments in Tennessee